Love from a Stranger is a 1947 American historical film noir directed by Richard Whorf and starring John Hodiak and Sylvia Sidney. The film is also known as A Stranger Walked In in the United Kingdom. It is based on the play of the same title by Frank Vosper, inspired by a short story by Agatha Christie, which had previously been turned into a 1937 British film Love from a Stranger starring Basil Rathbone.

Plot
A woman fears her new husband will kill her.

Cast
 John Hodiak as Manuel Cortez
 Sylvia Sidney as Cecily Harrington
 Ann Richards as Mavia
 John Howard as Nigel Lawrence
 Isobel Elsom as Auntie Loo-Loo
 Ernest Cossart as Billings
 Philip Tonge as Dr. Gribble
 Anita Sharp-Bolster as Ethel (the maid)
 Frederick Worlock as Insp. Hobday
 Phyllis Barry as Waitress

Reception

Critical response
Thomas M. Pryor, the film critic at The New York Times, gave the film a lukewarm review.  He wrote, "It may well be that some will find a modicum of excitement in Love From a Stranger. But the average moviegoer is a pretty 'hep' customer and the chances are he will be so far ahead of the story that its climactic scene will explode with all the thunder of a cap pistol."

Critic Craig Butler also had problems with the film, mostly the script.  He wrote, "A moderately entertaining mystery flick (the story of which was better served when it was originally filmed in 1937), Love from a Stranger is an adequate but unexciting way to spend an hour and a half or so. Stranger wants to be a clever thriller, and it starts out well. Unfortunately, about halfway through it becomes rather obvious, and so the necessary suspense is simply lacking."

References

External links
 
 
 
 

1947 films
1940s mystery thriller films
1947 romantic drama films
Films based on works by Agatha Christie
American black-and-white films
Eagle-Lion Films films
American films based on plays
Films directed by Richard Whorf
American mystery thriller films
American romantic drama films
Films set in London
Films set in the 1900s
1940s historical films
American historical films
Films scored by Hans J. Salter
1940s English-language films
1940s American films